Michael Albert Yobo (born May, 1979 in Port Harcourt, Nigeria) is a retired Nigerian football defender. Previously, he played for AJ Auxerre, VfL Osnabrück, Grazer AK, FC Zwolle, and Pontevedra CF in Europe.

He is the older brother of Nigeria international captain Joseph Yobo. In July 2008, their younger brother Norum Yobo was kidnapped in Port Harcourt, Rivers State, Nigeria and held for ransom. He was eventually released after 12 days on 17 July 2008.

His brothers charity, the Joseph Yobo Foundation, run a youth football tournament in Nigeria which bears his name, the Albert Yobo Soccer Championship.

Career
Yobo made his debut for Nigeria aged 18 against Zambia in a friendly in December 1997.

Charity work
In 2007, his brother Joseph Yobo set up the Joseph Yobo Charity Foundation, to help under-privileged children in Nigeria. As of 18 July 2007, together they have handed out over 300 scholarship awards ranging from primary to university level. Yobo has started a football academy in the Ogoni region of Nigeria. He also runs football camps in Lagos. See the Everton Lagos project for more information.

References

External links
Trials with Leyton Orient BBC
Joseph Yobo Foundation

1979 births
Living people
Nigerian footballers
Nigerian expatriate footballers
Nigeria international footballers
AJ Auxerre players
PEC Zwolle players
La Liga players
Pontevedra CF footballers
Association football defenders
Nigerian expatriate sportspeople in Austria
Sportspeople from Port Harcourt